Birnstiel is a German surname. Notable people with the surname include:

Friedrich Wilhelm Birnstiel, German music publisher
Johann Georg Birnstiel (1858–1927), Swiss clergyman and writer

German-language surnames